Marsha Hunt (born Marcia Virginia Hunt; October 17, 1917 – September 7, 2022) was an American actress, model and activist. She was blacklisted by Hollywood film studio executives in the 1950s during the McCarthyism.

During her career spanning some almost 80 years, starting from 1935 until 2014, she appeared in around 70 films, popular titles include: Born to the West (1937), Pride and Prejudice (1940), Kid Glove Killer (1942), Cry 'Havoc' (1943), Raw Deal (1948), The Happy Time (1952), and Johnny Got His Gun (1971).

Filmography
Sources:

Radio appearances

References

Actress filmographies
American filmographies